Luca Frigo (born May 30, 1993) is an Italian professional ice hockey player currently playing for HC Bolzano in the ICE Hockey League (ICEHL) and the Italian national team.

He participated at the 2017 IIHF World Championship.

References

External links

1993 births
Living people
Italian ice hockey forwards
People from Moncalieri
Italian expatriate ice hockey people
Italian expatriate sportspeople in Sweden
Italian expatriate sportspeople in the United States
Bolzano HC players
Omaha Lancers players
HC Valpellice players
Sportspeople from the Metropolitan City of Turin